Downs Township is located in McLean County, Illinois. At the 2010 census, its population was 1,266 and it contained 483 housing units. Downs Township was originally named Savanna Township, but it was changed on May 17, 1858.

Geography

Demographics

References

External links
City-data.com
Illinois State Archives

Townships in McLean County, Illinois
Townships in Illinois